Social Democracy of the Republic of Poland (SdRP)  (SdRP) was a social-democratic political party in Poland created in 1990, shortly after the Revolutions of 1989. The party was the main party of the successor parties to the Polish United Workers Party (PZPR).

Among the creators and leading figures of SdRP were the former Polish president Aleksander Kwaśniewski, former speaker of the Sejm Józef Oleksy and former Prime Minister Leszek Miller.

On 15 April 1999, the SdRP was folded into the Democratic Left Alliance.

Election results

Sejm

References

1990 establishments in Poland
1992 disestablishments in Poland
Defunct social democratic parties in Poland
Former member parties of the Socialist International
Political parties disestablished in 1999
Political parties established in 1990